Håkan Andersson (born June 29, 1945) is a Swedish former professional motocross racer. He competed in the Motocross World Championships from 1966 to 1979. Andersson won the F.I.M. 250cc Motocross World Championship in 1973.

Born in Uddevalla, Sweden, Andersson began racing in the motocross world championships for the Husqvarna factory, finishing second behind Suzuki's Joël Robert in the 1971 250cc motocross world championship. For the 1972 season, Andersson was hired by the Yamaha to help develop their new motorcycle with its innovative rear suspension using a single shock absorber called a monoshock. He again came in second place to Robert. By the 1973 season, Yamaha's monoshock suspension outclassed the competition, taking Andersson to his first world championship ahead of Adolf Weil and Heikki Mikkola

Andersson was a member of the victorious Swedish 1974 Motocross des Nations team that included Bengt Aberg, Ake Jonsson and Arne Kring. In 1975, Andersson placed second once more behind Puch's Harry Everts. For the 1976 season, he signed to ride for the Montesa factory in the 250 class, and in 1977, he rode a Montesa in the 500cc class. He returned to Husqvarna in the 1978 and 1979 seasons in the 500cc class.

References

External links 
 Hakan Andersson interview

1945 births
Living people
People from Uddevalla Municipality
Swedish motocross riders
Sportspeople from Västra Götaland County